Antisabia, common name hoof shells or hoof snails, is a genus of small sea snails, limpet-like marine gastropod molluscs in the family Hipponicidae.

Distribution
This genus is distributed worldwide in warm seas.

Description
The sedentary species in this genus live on the underside of stones or commensally with their shells loosely attached to other and larger gastropods or invertebrates. This commensalism results in some morphological changes : a thin basal plate, a very long snout and a small osphradium. They live in colonies with a few big females are surrounded by many smaller males. The egg mass is kept within the female shell. When the eggs hatch, a few young escape at the crawling stage.

Genera

Genera within the genus Antisabia include:
 Antisabia erma (Cotton, 1938)
 Antisabia foliacea (Quoy & Gaimard, 1835)
 Antisabia imbricatus Gould, 1846
 Antisabia juliae Poulicek, Bussers & Vandewalle, 1996

References

Hipponicidae